Meridian Medical Technologies, LLC is an American company which specialized primarily in developing and manufacturing antidotes for chemical weapons.

It was founded in 1968 as Brunswick Biomedical Corporation and changed its name in November 1996 when it merged with Survival Technology, Inc.  Survival Technology, Inc. had been the employer of Sheldon Kaplan, who had invented various kinds of autoinjectors, including the epinephrine autoinjector, EpiPen.  The EpiPen was marketed and distributed by Dey LP, a subsidiary of Merck KGaA.

King Pharmaceuticals acquired Meridian in 2003, and the company became part of Pfizer when Pfizer acquired all of King's assets through a process that started in 2010 and was completed in 2011.

Meridian is a member of the Alliance for Biosecurity, which is a group of companies that work towards preventing and treating severe infectious diseases, especially those that present global security challenges.

Altaris Capital Partners, LLC entered into an agreement to acquire Meridian Medical Technologies (“Meridian”) from Pfizer on November 2, 2021 and completed the acquisition on January 4, 2022.

On November 14, 2022, Altaris LLC announced it will combine Meridian with Kindeva Drug Delivery, another operating company owned by Altaris.

Meridian Medical currently has plans to expand operations in Bridgeton, Missouri and add new production lines.

References

Pharmaceutical companies of the United States
Companies based in Columbia, Maryland
American companies established in 1968
Pharmaceutical companies established in 1968
1968 establishments in Maryland
Health care companies based in Maryland
Antidotes
2003 mergers and acquisitions
2022 mergers and acquisitions